Mórahalom is a town in Csongrád-Csanád county, in the Southern Great Plain region of southern Hungary. Mórahalom is known for its thermal spa.

Mórahalom is a developing town located  far from Szeged,  from the western exit of the M5 motorway, along the main road 55.

Etymology 
The name of the town originates from the sand dune of “Móra Halma”, which was first mentioned in 1729. The exact area of Móra is unknown, however, it is known that its eponym was the family Móra who come from Szeged-Lower Town.

History 
Since the founding of the town, it has developed incredibly due to the hard work and strong will of its inhabitants. The local farmers of the Sand Ridge taming the “golden eyed” sand enriched their settlement, which gained town rank in 1989.

The whole administrative area of the town is 8,311 ha, its outside urban area is 7.857 ha, its urban area is 454 ha with a population of 6,035. 1,587 of these inhabitants live in outside urban areas (farms).

The first industrial park of the Southern Great Plain was established here, the first qualified producing and selling union was organised here, more and more industrial workplaces are being created through small- and medium enterprise development programmes, the service sector is developing at a small regional level, and based on medical tourism a spa town has been established on the Sand Ridge region.

The town is said to have been at one point an epicentre of the European migrant crisis prior to further restrictions being put in place on migrants passing through.

Twin towns – sister cities

Mórahalom is twinned with:

 Chamerau, Germany
 Evje og Hornnes, Norway
 Fiumalbo, Italy
 Jimbolia, Romania
 Pievepelago, Italy
 Sânmartin, Romania
 Temerin, Serbia
 Uniejów, Poland

References

External links

  in Hungarian, English and German
 Mórahalom at funiq.hu 

Populated places in Csongrád-Csanád County